Yerevan Brandy Company ( (Yerevani Konyaki Gortsaran)), commonly known with its famous brand "ArArAt", is the leading enterprise of Armenia for the production of cognac. It was founded in 1887, during the period of the Russian Empire. After the Sovietization of Armenia, the factory became a state-owned enterprise. In 1999, the government of independent Armenia sold the factory to the French Pernod Ricard company for distilled beverages. The variety of the company's cognac products are labeled and publicized as ArArAt.

The company owns another factory in the town of Armavir, operating since 1966.

History

The Yerevan Brandy Company was founded in 1887 within the territories of the Erivan Fortress, by the wealthy 1st guild merchant Nerses Tairyan (Nerses Tairov), with the help of his cousin Vasily Tairov. However, the winery reached its hey-day in 1899, when it was leased to the Russian businessman Nikolay Shustov, who was a well-known vodka and liqueur producer. In 1900,  the factory was fully acquired by Shustov to become known as "Shustov and Sons". Shustov's company became the main supplier of the Imperial Majesty's court of Russia. During the International Exhibition in Paris in 1900, Shustov's Armenian brandy received the Grand-Prix and the legal right to be called "cognac", following a blind degustation.

In 1948, in connection with the reorganization of the Yerevan Ararat Wine-Brandy Factory (known until 1940 as the Shustov Factory), the factory building was separated into 2 entities: the Yerevan Ararat Brandy Factory and the Yerevan Brandy Factory. 

As a separate entity, the Yerevan Brandy Factory was transferred to a new building in 1953 constructed specifically for the production of brandy. It was designed by architect Hovhannes Margaryan. The new building stands on a high plateau at the western end of the Victory Bridge of Yerevan, on the right bank of Hrazdan River, opposite to the Yerevan Ararat Brandy Factory. With its nine austere arches, and long flight of steps leading to it, the building is hailed as one of the best architectural examples of the Soviet architecture in Yerevan.

Between 1953 and 1991, the Yerevan Brandy Factory was granted the rights to become the plant to produce Armenian cognac within the Soviet Union. Markar Sedrakian was among the notable chief technologist of the factory who served form 1948 until 1973, to achieve the title of the Hero of Socialist Labor in 1966.

After the collapse of the Soviet rule, the Yerevan Brandy Factory was sold by the Government of Armenia to French distiller Pernod Ricard for $30 million during June 1998, after competitive bidding organized by Admiralty Investment Group of New Zealand and Merrill Lynch International of London.

Within the factory territories, the company also runs the "Ararat Heritage Center Museum and Shop" open for public tours.

In 2001, a Peace Barrel was set for aging within the heritage center of the factory, in honor of the visit of OSCE Minsk Group co-chairs. The barrel will be opened only when the Karabakh conflict is resolved.

Armenian cognac production

The ArArAt Armenian cognac is derived from the grapes of the fertile fields of the Ararat plain, Tavush region as well as Nagorno-Karabakh.

In April 1999, on the initiative of Yerevan Brandy Company, a new standard was introduced in Armenia named "Armenian Cognac", which rigidly regulates the production of this beverage. Yerevan Brandy Company remains the uncontested leader on the volume of production and the export of Armenian brandy. Many retired brands of the company are inaccessible to the retail network and can only be obtained from the factory's shop.

The Yerevan Brandy Company's trademark is registered in 47 countries. Currently, the company's products are exported to more than 25 countries, including Russia, Ukraine and Belarus.

Cognac brands
Currently, the Yerevan Brandy Company produces a variety of ArArAt Armenian cognac under several brands, including:
ArArAt Erebuni, 30 years old.
ArArAt Nairi, 20 years old.
ArArAt, 3, 5 and 25 years old.
ArArAt Tonakan, 15 years old.
ArArAt Akhtamar, 10 years old.
ArArAt Otborny, 7 years old.
ArArAt Ani, 6 years old.
ArArAt Dvin, collection.
ArArAt Armenia, collection.

Retired brands include "Ararat Vaspurakan" 15 years old, ArArAt Kilikia 30 years old, ArArAt Sparapet 40 years old and ArArAt Noah's Ark 70 years old.

See also
Ararat (brandy)
Yerevan Ararat Brandy Factory
Yerevan Champagne Wines Factory

References

External links
Official website
Yerevan Brandy Company

Companies of Armenia
Food and drink companies established in 1887
Armenian brands
Armenian distilled drinks
Distilleries in Armenia
Yerevan
Drink companies of the Soviet Union
Wineries of Armenia
Companies nationalised by the Soviet Union
1887 establishments in the Russian Empire